Valenciennea is a genus of small, bottom-dwelling fish in the family Gobiidae. They are found over sandy bottoms, often at coral reefs in the Indo-Pacific. The members of the genus tend to rest directly on the substrate for extended periods of time. While this is a common behavior for members of the family, this genus also float motionless directly above the substrate, which is why they are sometimes called glider gobies. Their resting behavior has resulted in the vernacular name "sleeper gobies", which invites confusion with the related family Eleotridae. The members of this genus are known to be carnivorous sand-sifters; to eat, they simply engulf entire mouthfuls of sand which they expel through their gills. Specialized structures in their gills filter small crustaceans and worms as the sand is expelled. It is this specific trait that makes some members of the genus attractive to the marine aquarist, and they are often introduced into a marine aquarium for sand-sifting. Some of the species are known to be monogamous. The genus was named after notable French zoologist Achille Valenciennes. These fish are difficult to keep in a tank. Tanks with plenty of live sand and live rock are recommended. Offer foods such as sinking shrimp pellets. Fish may die even if eating properly.

Species
There are currently 16 recognized species in this genus:

References

 
Taxa named by Pieter Bleeker
Gobiinae